Jason Paul Collum (born July 15, 1973, in Brookfield, Wisconsin) is an American film maker.

Biography
Raised in Racine, Wisconsin. He worked at Femme Fatales and Cinefantastique magazines as a writer, editor and graphic designer. Collum is the author of the non-fiction book Assault of the Killer Bs: Interviews with 20 Cult Film Actresses (McFarland, 2004) and the fiction novella Basements (2016). He wrote and directed the horror starlets documentary Something to Scream About (2003) which aired on Showtime from 2004 to 2007. Collum worked as a publicity director for Rapid Heart Pictures from 1999 - 2002 and for Tempe Entertainment from 2002 - 2004. He is director/writer of the October Moon franchise. He directed the documentaries Screaming in High Heels: The Rise & Fall of the Scream Queen Era (licensed to NBCUniversal) focusing on the careers of Linnea Quigley, Brinke Stevens and Michelle Bauer, & also Sleepless Nights: Revisiting the Slumber Party Massacres about The Slumber Party Massacre horror film franchise by Roger Corman. In 2011 Collum directed his only comedy Shy of Normal: Tales of New Life Experiences. From 2009 - 2011 he lectured film theory at the University of Wisconsin-Parkside, where he graduated in 1996. He earned a post-baccalaureate degree in Early Childhood Education in 2014 from the University of Wisconsin - Milwaukee. He continues to teach and write and direct films. In 2017 he released the monster-in-the-house thriller Safe Inside, and the documentary Everything I Need to Know I Learned from The Letter People (2021), about the childhood reading & PBS television program created in 1968 by Elayne Reiss Weimann and Rita Friedman.

The April/May 2013 issue of The Advocate magazine listed him as one of their "40 under 40" most intriguing artists to watch. He and his films are studied in the collegiate journal, and the cinema books, and.

Notes

External links
 Collum's official website
 

1973 births
LGBT film directors
Living people
University of Wisconsin–Parkside alumni
University of Wisconsin–Parkside faculty